Abiola Babes was a Nigerian football team that played in Abeokuta. It was owned by Bashorun Moshood K Abiola and was promoted to the Nigeria First Division in 1984.

After a period of hiatus in the 1990s, the team reformed in May 2000 but was disbanded the next year for lack of funds.
Their last game was in the 2001 Challenge Cup against NIPOST FC.

Achievements
Nigeria 2nd Division Champion
1983
Nigerian FA Cup: 2
1985, 1987

Performance in CAF competitions
African Cup Winners' Cup: 2 appearances
1986: First Round
1987: Semifinals

References

Football clubs in Nigeria
Defunct football clubs in Nigeria
Abeokuta
Association football clubs disestablished in 2001
2001 disestablishments in Nigeria